La Voix du Nord ("The Voice of the North") is a double disc album by Malena Ernman, who represented  in Eurovision Song Contest 2009. The first CD contains 11 pop songs including "La Voix", which was Ernman's entry at the Eurovision Song Contest, and the second CD contains 11 arias. The album was released on July 1, 2009 in Sweden. It debuted at #1 on the official album chart and was certified Gold in its first week and eventually was certified Platinum in September 2009.

Track listing

Disc One 
 "One Step From Paradise" – F. Kempe/A. Hansson/S. Vaughn
 "La Voix" – F. Kempe/A. Hansson/S. Vaughn
 "Min plats på jorden" – F. Kempe/A. Hansson/P. Bäckman
 "Sempre libera" – F. Kempe/A. Hansson
 "What Becomes Of Love" – F. Kempe/A. Hansson/S. Vaughn
 "Un bel dì" – F. Kempe/G. Puccini
 "Breathless Days" – F. Kempe/A. Hansson/S. Vaughn
 "Perdus" – F. Kempe/A. Hansson/C. Måhlén
 "Tragedy" – F. Kempe/A. Hansson/A. Bard
 "All The Lost Tomorrows" – F. Kempe/A. Hansson/S. Vaughn
 "La Voix (acoustic)" – F. Kempe/M. Ernman

Disc Two 
 "Quando me'n vo" – Giacomo Puccini
 "Voi che sapete" – Wolfgang Amadeus Mozart
 "Solveig's Song" – Edvard Grieg
 "O mio babbino caro" – Giacomo Puccini
 "Vedrai carino" – Wolfgang Amadeus Mozart
 "Una voce poco fa" – Gioachino Rossini
 "Lascia ch'io pianga" – George Frideric Handel
 "Caro mio ben" – Giuseppe Giordani
 "Non più mesta" – Gioachino Rossini
 "Ombra mai fu" – George Frideric Handel
 "Dido's Lament" – Henry Purcell

Chart positions

Weekly charts

Year-end charts

References 

2009 albums
Malena Ernman albums